The 1946 Indiana Hoosiers football team was an American football team that represented the Indiana Hoosiers in the 1946 Big Nine Conference football season. In their 13th year under head coach Bo McMillin, the Hoosiers compiled a 6–3 record (4–2 against Big Nine opponents), outscored opponents by a total of 129 to 95, finished in third place in the Big Nine, and were ranked No. 20 in the final AP Poll. 

On defense, the Hoosiers led the Big Nine and ranked 14th nationally, allowing an average of only 179.9 yards per game. In passing defense, they ranked fourth nationally, giving up only 59.8 yards per game.

The Hoosiers also fielded the second best passing offense in the Big Nine, and ranked seventh nationally, with an average of 140.4 passing yards per game. The team's pass offense was led by quarterback Ben Raimondi who ranked third nationally with 956 passing yards. End Lou Mihajlovich was the team's leading receiver with 25 receptions for 300 yards.

Fullback Pete Pihos was named the team's most valuable player. Two Hoosiers received second-team honors on the 1946 All-America college football team: Raimondi (Associated Press) and center John Cannady (Central Press). Four Hoosiers also received honors from the Associated Press (AP) or United Press (UP) on the 1946 All-Big Nine Conference football team: Raimondi (AP-1, UP-1); tackle Russ Deal (AP-1, UP-1); Cannady (AP-1, UP-2); and Pihos (UP-2).

The Hoosiers played their home games at Memorial Stadium in Bloomington, Indiana.

Schedule

After the season

The 1947 NFL Draft was held on December 16, 1946. The following Hoosiers were selected.

References

Indiana
Indiana Hoosiers football seasons
Indiana Hoosiers football